Ri Ye-gyong (born 26 October 1989 in Pyongyang) is a North Korean football midfielder who played for the North Korea women's national football team at the 2012 Summer Olympics. At the club level, she played for Amrokkang.

International goals

See also
 North Korea at the 2012 Summer Olympics

References

External links
 
 

1989 births
Living people
North Korean women's footballers
Footballers at the 2012 Summer Olympics
Olympic footballers of North Korea
Women's association football midfielders
Asian Games medalists in football
Footballers at the 2010 Asian Games
Footballers at the 2014 Asian Games
North Korea women's international footballers
Asian Games gold medalists for North Korea
Asian Games silver medalists for North Korea
People from Pyongyang
Medalists at the 2010 Asian Games
Medalists at the 2014 Asian Games
2011 FIFA Women's World Cup players
21st-century North Korean women